Fort Halifax was located along the Susquehanna River near the present day borough of Halifax, Pennsylvania, United States. It was a temporary stronghold in northern Dauphin County, Pennsylvania, from 1756 to 1757, during the time of the French and Indian War.

Construction 
The fort was erected by Col. William Clapham, with the order of Governor Morris, and guarded by a garrison of the Third Battalion of the Pennsylvania Provincial Regiment. Fort Halifax was constructed as a subpost along the Susquehanna with three other forts, Fort Harris, Fort Hunter, and Fort Augusta. On 5 June, 1756, Clapham marched out of Fort Hunter with five companies of men to proceed north along the Susquehanna River to establish a supply post, which would become Fort Halifax. He picked the site along the Susquehanna River due to its proximity to a vast stand of pine timber that could be used for construction and because it was near a water-powered sawmill on Armstrong Creek. In a June 11 letter to Governor Morris, Clapham noted that the site he chose for the fort was suitable in part due to "...the vast Plenty of Pine Timber at Hand, its nearness to Shamokin and a Saw within a Quarter of a Mile." In later correspondence he mentions the complete absence of roads along the river. 

The fort was originally named "Camp at Armstrong" until General Morris changed it in 1756. It was a  square log stockade with four bastions and a surrounding earthwork about 10 feet high. Once it was complete, it was guarded by a garrison of the Pennsylvania Colonial Militia and for the next 16 months, Fort Halifax served as the chief supply post on the line of communications between the area settlements and Shamokin where Fort Augusta would be built later that same year.

Meeting with Iroquois leaders 

On 10 June, Clapham held a conference with Oghaghradisha, an Iroquois chief, at Clapham's military camp. Oghaghradisha presented Clapham with a wampum belt and gave Clapham the Iroquois name "Ugcarumhiunth." He told Clapham that 
"The Iroquois living on the North Branch of Sasquehanna have lent me as a representative of the whole, to treat with you and will ratify all my contracts. Brother, they agree to your building a Fort at Shamokin, but are desirous that you should also build a Fort three days journey, in a canoe, higher up, the North Branch, in their country, at a place called "Adjouquay" (present-day Pittston, Pennsylvania). If you agree to my proposals in behalf of my nation, I will return and immediately collect our whole force to be employed in protecting your people while you are building a fort in our country...The land is troubled, and you may justly apprehend danger, but if you will grant our request we will be together, and if any danger happens to you, we will share it with you."

Abandonment and dismantling 

In August, 1757, local citizens signed a petition alleging that Fort Halifax was unsuitable for their protection, and requesting the transfer of the garrison to Fort Hunter. They stated that Fort Halifax

"...is a very bad situation, being built beyond two ranges of hills, and nobody living near it, none could be protected by it; that it is no station for batteaux parties, having no command of the channel, which runs close on the western shore, and is besides covered with a large island between the channel and fort, so that numbers of the enemy may even in the daytime, run down the river without being seen by that garrison."

Late in 1757, the garrison at Fort Halifax was transferred back to Fort Hunter where they were considered better positioned for the defense of settlements south of Blue Mountain.

It was dismantled in 1763 having become superfluous at war's end.

Memorialization 

A stone monument, erected in 1926, is located along Pennsylvania Route 147 north of Halifax along Armstrong Creek. The area of the former fort is now part of the Halifax Township Park and Conservation Area, which consists of  bordered on one side by the Susquehanna River and contains a long stretch of Armstrong Creek.

Halifax Township was named in commemoration of the fort.

See also
 List of Forts in the United States
 William Clapham
 Fort Augusta

References

External links

French and Indian War forts
Forts in Pennsylvania
Colonial forts in Pennsylvania
Buildings and structures in Dauphin County, Pennsylvania
Protected areas of Dauphin County, Pennsylvania
1756 establishments in Pennsylvania